Volodymyr Pryjma was a Ukrainian Greek Catholic choir director and martyr.

Pryjma was born on 17 July 1906 in the village of Stradch, Yavoriv District. He graduated from a school for cantors, which was at that time under the care of Metropolitan Andrey Sheptytsky. He was made the cantor and choir director in the local village church in Stradch. Prijma was married with two young children.   
 
On 26 June 1941, four days after the start of the German-Soviet War, agents of the Soviet Union's NKVD mercilessly tortured and murdered him, along with Mykola Konrad, in a forest near Stradch as they were returning from the house of a sick woman who had requested the sacrament of reconciliation. His body had not been found until a week after the murder. He had been stabbed multiple times in the chest with a bayonet.

He was beatified by Pope John Paul II on 27 June 2001. 

On Saturday, November 2nd 2019, Volodymyr Pryjma's relics were placed in Holy Eucharist Ukrainian Catholic Cathedral, New Westminster, British Columbia Canada.

Influence 
Yurii Sakavronskyi in an interview recounted the martyrdom: 

"Fr Konrad went with the holy sacraments to fulfill his sacred obligation, hearing a woman's confession in the neighboring village. He felt he had to go, though he was stopped. I know that they stopped him and said; 'Father, don't go. Look what's happening;the war has started, anything could happen.' He said that this was his sacred duty and that he had to go. He got  dressed and left together with Volodymyr Pryjma, the cantor. They didn't come back. After a week, they were found there, murdered. People thought something was wrong. So they went to look for them and found them there. It was awful. The cantor's wife had two children. One was three, the other was four. Momma told how when they were found everyone was overcome by what they saw. The cantor was especially cut up, his chest stabbed with a bayonet many times."

References 

Biographies of twenty five Greek-Catholic Servants of God at the website of the Vatican
Beatification of the Servants of God on June 27, 2001 at the website of the Ukrainian Greek Catholic Church
Alan Butler, Paul Burns. Butler's lives of the saints. Continuum International Publishing Group, 2005. p76

1906 births
1941 deaths
People from Lviv Oblast
People from the Kingdom of Galicia and Lodomeria
Ukrainian Austro-Hungarians
Members of the Ukrainian Greek Catholic Church
Ukrainian beatified people
Catholic people executed by the Soviet Union
Ukrainian people executed by the Soviet Union
People executed by stabbing
Beatifications by Pope John Paul II